Ruperče (in older sources Roperce) is a settlement in the hills east of Maribor in northeastern Slovenia. It belongs to the City Municipality of Maribor.

References

External links
Ruperče on Geopedia

Populated places in the City Municipality of Maribor